Ludo Troch is a film editor with more than sixty film credits. His editing credits include Le Concert, A Distant Neighborhood, Séraphine, Live and Become, Everybody's Famous!, Violette and The History of Love. Troch received the César Award for Best Editing for Cavale (2002). He was also nominated for the Magritte Award for Best Editing three times for his work in Le Concert, One Night and Not My Type.

References

External links

Ludo Troch at the British Film Institute

Belgian film editors
Living people
César Award winners
Year of birth missing (living people)